, commonly referred to as , is a fictional character from Square Enix's video game franchise Kingdom Hearts. Having first made cameos in Kingdom Hearts II and other related titles, Ventus was introduced in the 2010 prequel Kingdom Hearts Birth by Sleep as one of the game's three playable protagonists. In its story, Ventus is introduced as the youngest apprentice of Master Eraqus who trains him alongside his best friends, Terra and Aqua, to become experienced warriors with the Keyblade.

When Terra goes on a mission to find Master Xehanort, Ventus follows him, having also become concerned about his fate. As Ventus journeys through various worlds and battles dark creatures called the Unversed, he learns about his own origins as well as his relation to Xehanort's apprentice, Vanitas.

Ventus was designed by director Tetsuya Nomura who wanted to create a character with an important connection with the series' main character Sora. He bears a strong resemblance to the character of Roxas, both of whom are voiced by Kōki Uchiyama in Japanese and Jesse McCartney in English. After Ventus's first cameo, Nomura had to clarify that both of them are different characters, and that the reason for such connection would be revealed in Birth by Sleep. Video game websites also commented on Ventus's first appearance, initially confusing him for Roxas during the development of Birth by Sleep, but has since been well received.

Appearances
Before being introduced in Kingdom Hearts Birth by Sleep, Ventus made cameos in the secret endings of Kingdom Hearts II and its re-release, Kingdom Hearts II Final Mix, which depict him and his friends Terra and Aqua battling Master Xehanort and Vanitas. Ventus is also shown in a cameo in Kingdom Hearts 358/2 Days when Xion, a replica of Roxas, appears as Ventus while fighting Xigbar from Organization XIII. Ventus is also constantly referenced by Xigbar in Kingdom Hearts II and 358/2 Days while Xemnas, the Nobody of Xehanort, searches for him in Castle Oblivion.

Birth by Sleep introduces Ventus as an apprentice of Master Xehanort, who tries conditioning him into a dark component of the χ-blade. Due to Ventus's reluctance to use darkness, Xehanort extracts it from his heart and creates Vanitas, damaging his heart in the process. Xehanort brings Ventus to the Destiny Islands, where his heart connects with that of a newborn Sora to keep it from collapsing. An amnesiac Ventus is placed under Master Eraqus's care alongside Terra and Aqua, whom he forms a sibling-like bond with. At the game's beginning, Vanitas provokes Ventus into pursuing Terra during the latter's search for Xehanort, pitting him against dark creatures called the Unversed to strengthen him. Upon meeting Xehanort, Ventus rediscovers his purpose in the χ-blade's creation. Ventus refuses to battle Vanitas and create the weapon, but is forced to do so after Vanitas threatens his friends. They battle within the Keyblade Graveyard, where Vanitas merges with Ventus and obtains the χ-blade. However, the fusion is incomplete, which allows Ventus to destroy both Vanitas and the χ-blade within his heart, losing his own heart as a result. Aqua reconfigures the Land of Departure into Castle Oblivion to keep Ventus's catatonic body safe, while his wandering heart is able to find its way back to Sora, who accepts Ventus's heart into his body.

Ventus makes an appearance in Kingdom Hearts Coded, where Mickey Mouse—whom Ventus befriends in the previous game—discovers his heart is connected with Sora's. In Kingdom Hearts 3D: Dream Drop Distance, Sora briefly takes Ventus's form during a dream, and when his heart is wounded, Ventus's armor appears to protect his body. In the game's ending, Ventus is seen smiling in Castle Oblivion, still asleep. An apparition of Ventus appears in the realm of darkness in Kingdom Hearts 0.2: Birth by Sleep – A Fragmentary Passage, a playable episode included in Kingdom Hearts HD 2.8 Final Chapter Prologue. Kingdom Hearts Union χ, set many years before Birth by Sleep, reveals Ventus to have been a member of the Dandelions and one of the five Union leaders chosen after the end of the Keyblade War. Together with the other leaders, he forms Union Cross to prevent history from repeating itself. Ventus returns in Kingdom Hearts III after being restored and reunited with Terra, Aqua, and his Dream Eater partner Chirithy.

Ventus also makes an appearance in Super Smash Bros. Ultimate as a spirit.

Creation and development
When first designing Ventus, Tetsuya Nomura already decided the character should look like Sora or Roxas, and decided to choose the latter when thinking that Vanitas being revealed to have Sora's appearance would give a big impact to the gamers. Nomura wanted Ventus's personality to more closely resemble Sora's, which led to his outgoing personality, yet at the same time he wanted him to become more serious as the game progressed to make them distinct. Ventus was first shown in the secret endings of Kingdom Hearts II and its rerelease Kingdom Hearts II: Final Mix. Ventus's name first appeared as a code in a 2006 Tokyo Game Show promotional video of the games. While making Final Mix’s ending, Nomura had only developed the backstory for Terra, Aqua and Ventus and not their appearances, but had to finish their design for the end of game cameo. Nomura did not reveal their identities, and only stated that the three character were from the chronological past of the Kingdom Hearts series. Following their release, Nomura stated that his nickname was Ven. Ventus was first mentioned by the character Lingering Sentiment in Final Mix as Ven, while his full name was still unrevealed. He also mentioned a connection between him and Xemnas but wanted to leave it up to people's imaginations as he still could not reveal his identity.

Nomura commented that, despite how similar they are, Roxas and Ventus are not the same character. Additionally, he stated that by playing Kingdom Hearts Birth by Sleep, players will be able to distinguish Roxas from Ventus and that the game explores his true personality. In another interview, Nomura implied both characters are related, specifically to Sora, but he wanted fans to imagine reasons for such connection. The guidebook Kingdom Hearts Birth by Sleep Ultimania clarified the connection, stating that Roxas and Ventus look alike because Ventus's heart entered Sora's body, and that Ventus's presence influenced Roxas's appearance when he was created. In early versions of development, Nomura planned to have Ventus's broken heart be healed by the heart of Sora before he was born, but after negative feedback from overseas coworkers, it was abandoned. Like Roxas, Ventus has been voiced Kōki Uchiyama in Japanese and Jesse McCartney in English.

Ventus's name means "wind" in Latin; both it and his Keyblade's default form, have a "sky" theme similar to that of Sora's. During the development of Birth by Sleep, the Osaka team in charge of developing the game suggested that Ventus should be related with Vanitas, something which Nomura liked as he wanted to add more connections within the story; Vanitas's name was chosen to sound similar to Ventus's name. Nomura had trouble designing the armor for Ventus, Terra, and Aqua, since the gameplay mechanism for activating their armor had not been fleshed out. Therefore, an "X" was added to their clothes as a way to activate the armor, as well as due to the fact it was one of the game's keywords. Ever since development of Birth by Sleep started, the staff already decided that Ventus, Aqua, and Terra's stories would be told in separate scenarios, with Ventus's story being the second one written. They also wanted emphasize the lack of coincidences in the series, leading to the interaction between the three scenarios. In the perspective of gameplay, Ventus was designed to be the easiest character to play with in Birth by Sleep, although Nomura recommended to players that Ventus should be the second character to play with in order to better understand the story. Additionally, the way Ventus handles his Keyblade backwards is meant to show the gameplay differences between his and Terra's and Aqua's scenarios. Nomura also remarked that Ventus's encounter with the characters Lea and Isa as an important event from the game, hoping both newcomers and older gamers will also find it important from Ventus's perspective.

Reception
Due to his resemblance with Roxas, video game publications initially thought that Roxas would be one of the protagonists from Kingdom Hearts Birth by Sleep upon seeing one of Ventus's images. However, when it was revealed that the two were separate characters, publications continued to discuss how similar they were and if there was a connection between them. GamesRadar particularly thought that there would be an eventual connection between the two of them and Sora. Amanda L. Kondolojy from Cheat Code Central also commented on speculations regarding the similarities between both of them, but mentioned that due to the existence of Nobodies in series, it is hard to find them as coincidences. When Jesse McCartney confirmed he was working on the English localization of Birth by Sleep, sites thought that he would voice Ventus, as he also voiced Roxas in previous titles. The character's story and actions shown in the demonstrations were praised for being the "most original take on Kingdom Hearts" and yet "frustratingly traditional".

Upon Ventus's introduction in Birth by Sleep, X-Play found the character to be very similar to Sora's due to his friendly attitude. Kevin VanOrd from the same site gave praise to Ventus's character for his "well-meaning" and yet not "annoying" personality. The site also said that the time players spend playing with Ventus would be "rewarding" and commented on the English voice acting. PlayStation LifeStyle's Thomas Williams found the trio of Ventus, Terra and Aqua as welcome additions to the franchise, finding their stories enjoyable even though the three travel to the same worlds. On the other hand, PALGN found the three characters unappealing, labelling Ventus as "just a Roxas clone, but without his personality." In contrast to 1UP's comments towards Ventus's actions in Cinderella's world, VanOrd commented on such interactions to be "more bothersome than boisterous." Writing for GamesRadar, Chris Antistaer called Ventus a "Roxas-clone", and did not understand why he was briefly featured in Kingdom Hearts II. Bob Muir from Destructoid noted that fans considered Ventus to be the most important character in Birth by Sleep due to his similarities to Roxas. Additionally, Miur praised Jesse McCartney's work as Ventus's English voice actor for making his story mode more engaging to players.

References

Characters designed by Tetsuya Nomura
Fictional aviators
Fictional bodyguards in video games
Fictional characters with amnesia
Fictional empaths
Fictional explorers in video games
Fictional knights in video games
Kingdom Hearts original characters
Male characters in video games
Square Enix protagonists
Video game characters introduced in 2010
Video game characters who can move at superhuman speeds
Video game characters with air or wind abilities